Acid-stable equine picornavirus (EqPV) is a member virus of Erbovirus A in the family Picornaviridae. They were isolated in the UK and Japan, from nasal swabs of horses with acute febrile respiratory disease.

The Erbovirus genus includes three serotypes: ERBV1, ERBV2 and ERBV3.

References

Picornaviridae
Infraspecific virus taxa